KROV (91.1 FM) is a radio station licensed to serve the community of Oroville, California. The station is owned by Bird Street Media Project and airs a variety format. The station was assigned the KROV call letters by the Federal Communications Commission on March 29, 2012.

References

External links
 Official Website
 

ROV (FM)
Radio stations established in 2013
2013 establishments in California
Variety radio stations in the United States
Community radio stations in the United States
Butte County, California